This is a list of the mammal species recorded in Qatar. There are seven mammal species in Qatar, one of which is vulnerable, and one is near threatened.

The following tags are used to highlight each species' conservation status as assessed by the International Union for Conservation of Nature:

Some species were assessed using an earlier set of criteria. Species assessed using this system have the following instead of near threatened and least concern categories:

Order: Sirenia (manatees and dugongs) 

Sirenia is an order of fully aquatic, herbivorous mammals that inhabit rivers, estuaries, coastal marine waters, swamps, and marine wetlands. All four species are endangered.
Family: Dugongidae
Genus: Dugong
Dugong, D. dugon

Order: Rodentia (rodents) 

Rodents make up the largest order of mammals, with over 40% of mammalian species. They have two incisors in the upper and lower jaw which grow continually and must be kept short by gnawing.

Suborder: Myomorpha
Family: Dipodidae (jerboas)
Genus: Jaculus
 Lesser Egyptian jerboa, Jaculus jaculus 
 Cheesman's gerbil, Gerbilus cheesmani 
Family: Muridae (mice, rats, gerbils, etc.)
Subfamily: Gerbillinae
Genus: Gerbillus
 Wagner's gerbil, Gerbillus dasyurus 
 Dwarf gerbil, Gerbillus nanus 
Genus: Meriones
 Libyan jird, Meriones libycus 
 Sundevall's jird, Meriones crassus 
Subfamily: Murinae
Genus: Mus
House mouse, Mus musculus  introduced
Genus: Rattus
 Black rat, Rattus rattus  introduced
 Brown rat, Rattus norvegicus  introduced

Order: Lagomorpha (lagomorphs) 

The lagomorphs comprise two families, Leporidae (hares and rabbits), and Ochotonidae (pikas). Though they can resemble rodents, and were classified as a superfamily in that order until the early twentieth century, they have since been considered a separate order. They differ from rodents in a number of physical characteristics, such as having four incisors in the upper jaw rather than two.

Family: Leporidae
Genus: Lepus
 Cape hare, Lepus capensis

Order: Eulipotyphla (shrews and hedgehogs) 

Eulipotyphla comprises the hedgehogs and gymnures (family Erinaceidae, formerly also the order Erinaceomorpha) and true shrews (family Soricidae).

Family: Erinaceidae (hedgehogs)
Subfamily: Erinaceinae
Genus: Paraechinus
 Desert hedgehog, Paraechinus aethiopicus

Order: Chiroptera (bats) 

The bats' most distinguishing feature is that their forelimbs are developed as wings, making them the only mammals capable of flight. Bat species account for about 20% of all mammals.

Family: Vespertilionidae
Subfamily: Myotinae
Genus: Otonycteris
 Desert long-eared bat, Otonycteris hemprichii 
Subfamily: Vespertilioninae
Genus: Rhyneptesicus
 Sind bat, Rhyneptesicus nasutus 
Family: Emballonuridae
Genus: Taphozous
 Naked-rumped tomb bat, Taphozous nudiventris 
Subfamily: Hipposiderinae
Genus: Asellia
 Trident leaf-nosed bat, Asellia tridens

Order: Cetacea (whales) 

The order Cetacea includes whales, dolphins and porpoises. They are the mammals most fully adapted to aquatic life with a spindle-shaped nearly hairless body, protected by a thick layer of blubber, and forelimbs and tail modified to provide propulsion underwater.
Suborder: Mysticeti
Family: Balaenopteridae (baleen whales)
Genus: Balaenoptera 
 Bryde's whale, Balaenoptera brydei 
Genus: Megaptera
Humpback whale, M. novaeangliae 
Suborder: Odontoceti
Superfamily: Platanistoidea
Family: Phocoenidae
Genus: Neophocaena
 Finless porpoise, Neophocaena phocaenoides 
Family: Physeteridae
Genus: Physeter
 Sperm whale, Physeter macrocephalus 
Family: Ziphiidae
Subfamily: Hyperoodontinae
Genus: Ziphius
 Cuvier's beaked whale, Ziphius cavirostris 
Family: Delphinidae (marine dolphins)
Genus: Delphinus
 Common dolphin, Delphinus capensis 
Genus: Grampus
 Risso's dolphin, Grampus griseus 
Genus: Lagenodelphis
 Fraser's dolphin, Lagenodelphis hosei 
Genus: Stenella
 Striped dolphin, Stenella coeruleoalba 
Genus: Steno
 Rough-toothed dolphin, Steno bredanensis 
Genus: Sousa
 Indo-Pacific humpbacked dolphin, Sousa chinensis 
Genus: Orcinus
Orca, O. orca 
Genus: Pseudorca
 False killer whale, Pseudorca crassidens 
Genus: Tursiops
 Indo-Pacific bottlenose dolphin, Tursiops aduncus 
 Common bottlenose dolphin, Tursiops truncatus

Order: Carnivora (carnivorans) 

There are over 260 species of carnivorans, the majority of which feed primarily on meat. They have a characteristic skull shape and dentition.
Suborder: Feliformia
Family: Felidae (cats)
Subfamily: Felinae
Genus: Felis
Sand cat, F. margarita  presence uncertain
Family: Herpestidae (mongooses)
Genus: Urva
Indian gray mongoose, U. edwardsii 
Family: Hyaenidae (hyaenas)
Genus: Hyaena
Striped hyena, H. hyaena  presence uncertain
Suborder: Caniformia
Family: Canidae (dogs, foxes)
Genus: Canis
Golden jackal, C. aureus 
Genus: Vulpes
 Rüppell's fox, V. rueppellii 
 Red fox, V. vulpes 
Family: Mustelidae (mustelids)
Genus: Mellivora
Honey badger, M. capensis

Order: Artiodactyla (even-toed ungulates) 

The even-toed ungulates are ungulates whose weight is borne about equally by the third and fourth toes, rather than mostly or entirely by the third as in perissodactyls. There are about 220 artiodactyl species, including many that are of great economic importance to humans.

Family: Bovidae (cattle, antelope, sheep, goats)
Subfamily: Antilopinae
Genus: Gazella
Arabian sand gazelle, Gazella  marica 
Subfamily: Hippotraginae
Genus: Oryx
Arabian oryx, Oryx leucoryx  reintroduced

See also
Wildlife of Qatar
List of chordate orders
Lists of mammals by region
List of prehistoric mammals
Mammal classification
List of mammals described in the 2000s

Notes

References
 

Lists of mammals by country
Lists of mammals of the Middle East
mammals

mammals